The 2014 ICF Canoe Slalom World Championships were the 36th edition of the ICF Canoe Slalom World Championships. The event took place from September 17 to 21, 2014 at Deep Creek Lake, Maryland, United States (Western Maryland near Pittsburgh) under the auspices of International Canoe Federation (ICF), at the Adventure Sports Center International facility.

The Deep Creek bid was selected by the ICF Board of Directors on April 15, 2011 in Paris. The other bids were by Vienna and Kraków.

In total there were 10 events of which 9 were medal events. The women's C1 team event did not count as a medal event due to insufficient number of participating federations. According to ICF rules, there must be at least 6 federations participating at a non-olympic event to count as a world championship event.

Schedule
This was the schedule of events. All times listed are EDT (UTC-4).

Medal summary

Men's

Canoe

Kayak

Women's

Canoe

Kayak

Medal table

References

External links
Official website 

2014
World Canoe Slalom Championships
World Canoe Slalom Championships
2014 in sports in Maryland
Canoeing and kayaking competitions in the United States
CF Canoe Slalom World Championships